The St. Mary's Church is an Eastern Orthodox church and monastery in Elbasan, Albania. It became a Cultural Monument of Albania in 1963.

The church's building started in 1483 in the Vlach neighborhood, but it ended almost a century later: the church had its first religious services only in 1556. It was built entirely in stone in a completely particular way, with stones carved in the shape of a cross, which can still be seen today. The church was frescoed by Onufri and restored by David Selenica.  In the 18th century it was entirely burned by a fire, so it was rebuilt in the beginning of the 19th century. Some of the most famous preachers in the church have been Fan Noli and Visarion Xhuvani.

In the 1990s the church became the seat of a split fraction of the Orthodox Autocephalous Church of Albania. 

In 2008 the Albanian government financed reconstruction of the church.

References

Cultural Monuments of Albania
Buildings and structures in Elbasan
Churches in Albania
Christian monasteries in Albania
Christian monasteries established in the 16th century
Churches completed in 1556
1556 establishments in the Ottoman Empire
Tourist attractions in Elbasan County